Willis (also Brady, Brady's Crossing, Vista) is an unincorporated community in Dakota County, Nebraska, United States. The community lies at the intersection of U.S. Route 20 and Nebraska Highway 12.

Notes

Unincorporated communities in Dakota County, Nebraska
Unincorporated communities in Nebraska